Maddison Amy Brown (born 23 April 1997) is an Australian actress and model. She is known for her role as Kirby Anders in the CW prime time soap opera Dynasty.

Life and career
Brown has two older sisters and her sister Allyson played basketball for Australia. At the age of 5, Brown began acting and then started modeling at age 12. When Brown was 16 she left high school and Australia to pursue a modeling career in New York City. Her parents came with her for the first few trips, but then she was on her own.

At the age of six, Brown made her acting debut in the 2004 television movie Go Big starring Justine Clarke. Speaking to Wonderland Magazine in 2015, Brown stated that acting as a child helped her deal with rejection which made her first few years as a model easier.

Soon after moving to New York, Brown was cast opposite Nicole Kidman in the 2015 drama film Strangerland and described the experience as "wonderful" and "career-altering".

In 2016, Brown co-starred in the Australian drama series The Kettering Incident opposite Elizabeth Debicki.

In 2018, Brown joined the cast of The CW prime time soap opera Dynasty playing the role of Kirby Anders. The show is filmed in Atlanta and it took Brown some time to adjust due to homesickness.

Some of the brands Brown has modelled for are Calvin Klein, Miu Miu, Jason Wu and Jasper Conran.

Brown is an ambassador for Pantene and Longines.

Personal life 
Speaking to Vice in 2014, Brown said that she had trouble connecting to people her own age because she had lived on her own overseas and had been working for so long. Despite missing out on the Australian high school rights of passage such as the school formal and schoolies week, Brown stated she didn't mind too much because she doesn't get into partying or drinking.

In June 2019, Brown was on the Zach Sang Show where she played F**k, Marry, Kill. She stated that she would never marry a Hemsworth brother because she felt they are too handsome and she felt too insecure. Despite this, in October 2019, Brown was spotted holding hands with Liam Hemsworth in New York.

Brown resides in Atlanta with her dog Poppy, but calls Sydney, Australia home. She calls herself a normal type-A person who is happy staying at home and maintaining privacy.

When speaking to Harpers Bazaar Australia in 2020 about how women are perceived in Hollywood, Brown stated "Women still definitely have to be ten times nicer and work ten times harder to be given the same opportunities as men in Hollywood. And you often hear about women being labelled as divas or difficult to work with, but you hear that far less about the men. That's because we, as a society, are more ready to label women as difficult".

Filmography

References

External links
 

1997 births
21st-century Australian actresses
Actresses from Melbourne
Australian television actresses
Living people
Australian expatriate actresses in the United States